Ihor Skoba (born 21 May 1982) is a professional Ukrainian football midfielder who currently plays for Ukrainian Second League club Arsenal Kyiv.

External links

 Official Website Profile

1982 births
Living people
Ukrainian footballers
FC Dynamo Kyiv players
FC Hoverla Uzhhorod players
FC Obolon-Brovar Kyiv players
FC Arsenal Kyiv players
FC Mariupol players
FC Zorya Luhansk players
FC Volyn Lutsk players
FC Sevastopol players
Ukrainian Premier League players
Ukrainian expatriate footballers
Expatriate footballers in Poland
OKS Stomil Olsztyn players
Ukrainian expatriate sportspeople in Poland
Association football midfielders